Pete Henderson (18 February 1895 Arran, Ontario – 19 June 1940 Los Angeles, California) was a Canadian racecar driver. He began racing career in 1915 at Des Moines Speedway, driving and as a mechanic for the Duesenberg team.

Indy 500 results

See also
List of Canadians in Champ Car

References

1895 births
1940 deaths
Racing drivers from Ontario
Indianapolis 500 drivers